Bavariicoccus is a genus of bacteria of the phylum Bacillota. This genus contains a single species, Bavariicoccus seileri, strains of which were originally isolated from German soft cheese. Bacterial taxonomists have suggested that Bavariicoccus may be more appropriately placed within the family Carnobacteriaceae.

References

External links
 LPSN entry for Bavariicoccus

Bacteria genera
Enterococcaceae
Gram-positive bacteria
Monotypic bacteria genera